Gallagher Ridge is a ridge that trends northeast from Mount Newall, Asgard Range, and descends to lower Wright Valley to the east of Decker Glacier, in Victoria Land, Antarctica. It was named by the Advisory Committee on Antarctic Names (1997) after Charles Gallagher, Command Master Chief, U.S. Naval Support Force, Antarctica, who served four austral summers at McMurdo Station, 1991–92 through 1994–95. Upon Navy retirement, Gallagher joined Antarctic Support Associates as Housing Coordinator at McMurdo Station, 1995–96 and 1996–97. He became ill during the winter-over period and died at McMurdo Station, May 1, 1997.

References

Ridges of Victoria Land
McMurdo Dry Valleys